The National Conscience Party (NCP) is a  nationalist political party in Nigeria.  The party was formed in 1994 but was prevented from standing in elections until 2003, when it won a legal battle to be able to do so. In the presidential election of that year the NCP candidate, Gani Fawehinmi, came fifth, polling 161,333 votes or 0.41% of the popular vote.

References

1994 establishments in Nigeria
Conservative parties in Nigeria
National conservative parties
Political parties established in 1994
Political parties in Nigeria
Social conservative parties